Anandham was a Tamil soap opera aired on Sun TV. It is a Prime time serial. The show premiered on 24 November 2003. It was aired Monday through Friday. The show stars Sukanya, Brinda Das, Delhi Kumar and Kamalesh. The show is produced by Sathya Jyothi Films director by T. G. Thyagarajan.

It was also airs in Sri Lanka Tamil Channel on Shakthi TV. The show last aired on 27 February 2009 and ended with 1297 episodes. It was also is being re-aired on Zee Tamil since 24 February 2014, Monday through Friday. It ended its run on 6 February 2015 after airing 239 episodes. It is also re-airing on Kalaignar TV since 20 February 2023 Monday to Saturday at 09:00 PM

Plot 
Anandham is a family drama with elements of business rivalry, romance, murders and other intrigues typical of Tamil soaps interwoven into it. However, unlike the stereotypical Tamil tear-jerker, Anandham depicts successful, independent-minded women rather than women battered by husbands and mothers-in-law. The patriarch of the family – Radhakrishnan or RK – is an eminent industrialist whose blissful existence is threatened by a series of events involving his four children. Much of the first part of the serial  revolved around two of RK's daughters-in-law. Shanthi, a widow with a child and married to RK's second son, Karthik, is the quintessential do-gooder in the serial but much of her early days were consumed by her struggle for acceptance within the family.

Shanthi's tribulations were multiplied by the other daughter-in-law in the family, Abhirami, who had hoped that Karthik would marry her younger sister. (Actress Brinda Das, who plays Abirami, turns in a superb performance as the arch villain). Abhirami had married into the RK family primarily to seek revenge on behalf of her late father, who had led her to believe that he had been wronged by RK in business. Soon, Abhirami began to wreak havoc on the RK family, stripping it of its family home and wealth. The tragedy of losing his family home sent RK into an ashram, where his character began to mellow. Subsequently, he reconciled with Shanthi and later accepted the remarriage of Madhan, who worked up the courage to dissolve his enforced marriage to Abhirami and return to his first love, Rohini.

A little more than a year into the serial, Abhirami, increasingly estranged from her more righteous brother and sister, discovered that she was an adopted child. A good part of the serial since that discovery involved Abhirami and her real parents trying to determine the identity of one another. Abhirami's real parents were separated from the time she was a baby. Her mother, Muthulakshmi, had left her father, the shady businessman Shankarapandian, after discovering that he had murdered someone for business gain. Muthulakshmi lost her child while trying to save herself from pursuers sent by her husband and subsequently moved to Malaysia. She has now returned in a new avatar as the business magnate Charulatha. A year on, Abhirami has reunited with her father. But her mother, who has long been yearning to be reunited with her daughter, now steadfastly refuses to accept a devious daughter.

In the latest phase of the serial, which has since been extended beyond its originally scheduled end date, the focus is again on the gathering storm in the lives of the RK family. Madhan cannot come to terms with the fact that his wife Rohini chose to pursue her ambition of becoming a bank manager and accepting a transfer to Tirupathi while his mother was lying comatose.  Rohini's inability to return to Chennai in time for her mother-in-law's funeral added further distance between husband and wife. Rohini has since relocated back to Chennai, fearing Shankarapandian's efforts to reunite his daughter Abhirami with her former husband.

Meanwhile, two new characters have been introduced, Manisha, the former girlfriend of Karthik while he was on army duty in Kashmir, and Rocky, their son born out of wedlock and now living in an orphanage in Chennai and closely cared for by his aunt, Karthik's sister Anitha. As in every long-running serial, there are many sub-plots and supporting characters in this serial. But the sub-plot that stands out the most and led to a spike in the serial's popularity ratings involves a romance revolving around the character of Assistant Commissioner Durai, popularly known as A C Durai by the huge fan following that the hunk Saakshi Sivaa  has garnered through the role. Durai is a conscientious police officer whose blind devotion to duty cost him the affections of his girlfriend Priya, who was subsequently adopted by the RK household, allowing for the seamless switch from the main story to the sub-plot. After about half a year of estrangement, the couple reunited and were set to tie the knot when jealousy set in—Priya misinterpreted Durai's relationship with an undercover police officer, Jamuna, masquerading as Shankarapandian's long-lost daughter. Durai then decided to put the marriage in abeyance until Priya gained sufficient trust in him. In the latest twist in the romance, Priya tries to demonstrate her maturity through self-sacrifice. She tries to persuade Durai to marry Jamuna, whose husband-to-be was killed by a vengeful Shankarapandian on the day of their intended marriage.

Cast

Main cast 
Sukanya as Shanthidevi "Shanthi" Karthik
Delhi Kumar as RK
Brinda Das as Abiramidevi "Abirami" Madhan
Sri Priya/Jaya Prabha as Charulatha/Muthulakshmi
Kamalesh PK as Karthikeyan "Karthik" Radhakrishnan (Shanthi's husband)

Recurring cast 
Sateesh Kumar as Madhankumar "Madhan" Radhakrishnan (Abhirami's husband)
S.Kavitha as Rohini
Saakshi Sivaa as Asst Commissioner Duraisingam "Durai"
Vanaja as Priya
Sanjeev as Arjun (RK's son-in-law)
Jaya Rekha
Vijay Babu
 Vandana Michael as Anitha Arjun (RK's daughter)
Baby Namurutha\Baby Indra\Baby Priyatharshini as Indhumathi "Indhu" Karthik (Shanthi's daughter)
Jahnvi as Rajeswari Radhakrishnan (RK's wife)
Afsar Babu as Joint Commissioner Vincent Retired Assistant Commissioner
Venkat as Shyam (Abhirami's brother)
Lakshmi as Jamuna
 Aishwarya as Ramya (Abhirami's sister)
Shreekumar as Rajapriyan
Mohan V. Ram as Srinivasan (Ramya's father-in-law)
Auditor Sridhar
Keerthika
Siva Kavitha
Abser
Rajendran
Nizhagal Rajasekhar
Vatsala Rajagopal
Vijay Adhiraj
Srikala paramasivam
Satish
Arithi
Chitra Lakshmanan
Harikaran
Nagesh Krishna moorthy
Thillai Rajan
Pasi Satya
Manindhar
Sai Deepika
B.R Illavarasan
Deepa Nethran
Banu Balasubramanian
Jaya Rekha
Rajkamal
Divya
Ramesh
Veerendra
 Sindhu shyam as Manisha

Awards and nominations

International broadcast 

 In Sri Lanka Tamil Channel on Shakthi TV.
 It aired in the Indian state of Kerala on Surya TV Dubbed in Malayalam language as Anandham.
 It aired in the Indian state of Andhra Pradesh on Gemini TV Dubbed in Telugu language as Anandham.
 In India Tamil Channel on Zee Tamil since 24 February 2014, Monday through Friday at 06:00PM. It ended its run on 6 February 2015 after airing 239 episodes.
 In India Tamil Channel on Kalaignar TV since 20 February 2023, Monday through Saturday at 09:00PM.

References

External links
 

Sun TV original programming
2003 Tamil-language television series debuts
Television shows set in Tamil Nadu
Tamil-language melodrama television series
2009 Tamil-language television series endings
Tamil-language television shows